The American University School of Public Affairs (SPA) is an institution of higher education and research located in Washington, D.C. that grants academic degrees in political science, public administration, public policy, and justice, law, and criminology. Established in 1934 as part of American University, the school houses three academic departments - Public Administration & Policy, Government, and Justice, Law & Criminology - as well as ten centers and institutes.

History 
SPA was created on March 3, 1934, with a $4,000 grant from the Rockefeller Foundation to provide training to 80 promising young federal government employees in downtown D.C. By 1937, its enrollment had grown to more than 1,000 students, and it quickly expanded its mission to include undergraduate and graduate degrees.

SPA's institutional role shifted several times over the next twenty years. In 1957, it was renamed the School of Government and Public Administration, and in 1973, it was combined with the existing Schools of Justice and International Service to become the College of Public and International Affairs. In 1988, the School of International Service was recreated as a freestanding school, and the College of Public and International Affairs was once again the School of Public Affairs.

The dean's office, department offices, and most faculty are located in Kerwin Hall. The executive education programs occupy the Watkins building, and some faculty and staff have offices in Hurst Hall.

Department of Public Administration and Policy 
The Department of Public Administration & Policy (DPAP) is home to 32 full-time faculty members and enrolls about 70% of SPA's graduate students.

Degree programs 
 Master of Public Administration
 Master of Public Policy
 Master of Public Administration and Policy
 Key Executive Master of Public Administration
 Master of Science in Organization Development
 Ph.D. in Public Administration and Policy

The MPA, Key Executive MPA, and MPP are accredited by the Network of Schools of Public Policy, Affairs, and Administration. The school is also an institutional member of the Association for Public Policy Analysis and Management.

Research centers 
 Center for Environmental Policy
 Center for Public Finance Research
 Institute for the Study of Public Policy Implementation
 Metropolitan Policy Center

Recognition 
DPAP's programs are routinely recognized by U.S. News & World Report as being among the top 20 in the country. In the 2020 ranking of graduate schools of public affairs, the department's masters programs are ranked 13th.

Notable faculty 
 Cornelius Kerwin, former president of American University
 Laura Langbein, quantitative methodologist and author of Public Program Evaluation: A Statistical Guide
 Howard E. McCurdy, space policy expert and author of Space and the American Imagination
 Kenneth J. Meier, founder of the Journal of Behavioral Public Administration and an expert on the political economy of regulatory agencies
 Barbara S. Romzek, expert on public management, accountability, and government reform
 David H. Rosenbloom, expert on administrative law and the National Partnership for Reinventing Government

Department of Government
The Department of Government is home to 29 full-time faculty members and focuses primarily on offering undergraduate political science courses to its 900 majors.

The Department of Government's three undergraduate academic advisers are Nathan Williamson, Tyler Poling, Jamie Juene, and Monica Barrera. James Helms is the administrative assistant.

Degree programs 
 Bachelors of Arts in Political Science, Communication, Legal Institutions, Economics, and Government (CLEG),
Justice and Law, Legal Studies
 Master of Arts in Political Science
 Master of Arts in Political Communication
 Master of Science in Data Science
 Ph.D. in Political Science

Research centers 
 Center for Congressional and Presidential Studies
 Center for Data Science
 Political Theory Institute
 Women & Politics Institute
 First Ladies Initiative
 Peace & Violence Research Lab
 Washington Institute for Public Affairs Research 
 Analytics and Management Institute
 Project on Civil Discourse

Recognition 
U.S. News & World Report ranks the Department of Government at #72 in the field of political science. The National Research Council ranks the department among the top 100 programs in the United States.

Notable faculty 
 William M. LeoGrande, professor, co-author of "Back Channel to Cuba: The Hidden History of Negotiations between Washington and Havana"
 David Lublin, marriage equality advocate and town mayor of Chevy Chase, Maryland
 Jennifer Lawless, former candidate for office and current manager of Women and Politics Institute
 Connie Morella, former U.S. representative from Maryland's 8th District
 Karen O'Connor, author of best-selling introductory American government text American Government: Roots and Reform
 James A. Thurber, author of Obama in Office and campaign management specialist

Department of Justice, Law, & Criminology
The Department of Justice, Law & Criminology is home to 24 full-time faculty, 210 undergraduate majors, and approximately 85 graduate students. JLC is home to AU's mock trial team, which has become a nationally competitive squad under the guidance of faculty coach Don Martin.

Degree programs 
 Undergraduate majors in Justice and Law & Society
 M.S. in Justice, Law, & Criminology
 M.S. in Terrorism and Homeland Security Policy
 Ph.D. in Justice, Law & Criminology

Research centers 
 Justice Programs Office
 Wrongful Convictions Project

Notes

External links
Official website

American University